Quantum technology is an emerging field of physics and engineering, encompassing technologies that rely on the properties of quantum mechanics, especially quantum entanglement, quantum superposition, and quantum tunneling. Quantum computing, sensors, cryptography, simulation, measurement, and imaging are all examples of emerging quantum technologies. The development of quantum technology also heavily impacts established fields such as space exploration.

Secure communications 

Quantum secure communication is a method that is expected to be 'quantum safe' in the advent of quantum computing systems that could break current cryptography systems using methods such as Shor's algorithm. These methods include quantum key distribution (QKD), a method of transmitting information using entangled light in a way that makes any interception of the transmission obvious to the user. Another method is the quantum random number generator, which is capable of producing truly random numbers unlike non-quantum algorithms that merely imitate randomness.

Computing 

Quantum computers are expected to have a number of important uses in computing fields such as optimization and machine learning. They are perhaps best known for their expected ability to carry out Shor's algorithm, which can be used to factorize large numbers and is an important process in the securing of data transmissions.

Quantum simulators 

Quantum simulators are types of quantum computers used to simulate a real world system and can be used to simulate chemical compounds or solve high energy physics problems. Quantum simulators are simpler to build as opposed to general purpose quantum computers because complete control over every component is not necessary. Current quantum simulators under development include ultracold atoms in optical lattices, trapped ions, arrays of superconducting qubits, and others.

Sensors 

Quantum sensors are expected to have a number of applications in a wide variety of fields including positioning systems, communication technology, electric and magnetic field sensors, gravimetry as well as geophysical areas of research such as civil engineering and seismology.

History
The field of quantum technology was first outlined in a 1997 book by Gerard J. Milburn, which was then followed by a 2003 article by Jonathan P. Dowling and Gerard J. Milburn, as well as a 2003 article by David Deutsch.

Many devices already available are fundamentally reliant on the effects of quantum mechanics. These include laser systems, transistors and semiconductor devices, as well as other devices such as MRI imagers. The UK Defence Science and Technology Laboratory (DSTL) grouped these devices as 'quantum 1.0' to differentiate them from what it dubbed 'quantum 2.0', which it defined as a class of devices that actively create, manipulate, and read out quantum states of matter using the effects of superposition and entanglement.

Future Goals 
In the realm of Quantum technology we are in the first couple years of its life. For each individual section of Quantum technology such as quantum computers, simulators, communications, sensors and metrology there is so much room for improvement according to Quantum in a nutshell. In the next couple years Quantum computers hope to process 50 qubits, as well as demonstrate quantum speed-up and outpreforming classical computers. Quantum simulators have the capability to solve problems beyond supercomputer capacity. For more information visit Quantum technologies in a nut shell. According to quantum technology expert Paul Martin Quantum technology promises improvements in everyday gadgets such as navigation, timing systems, communication security, computers, and more accurate healthcare imaging.

Research programmes

From 2010 onwards, multiple governments have established programmes to explore quantum technologies, such as the UK National Quantum Technologies Programme, which created four quantum 'hubs', the Centre for Quantum Technologies in Singapore, and QuTech, a Dutch center to develop a topological quantum computer. In 2016, the European Union introduced the Quantum Technology Flagship, a €1 Billion, 10-year-long megaproject, similar in size to earlier European Future and Emerging Technologies Flagship projects.
 In December 2018, the United States passed the National Quantum Initiative Act, which provides a US$1 billion annual budget for quantum research. China is building the world's largest quantum research facility with a planned investment of 76 billion Yuan (approx. €10 Billion). Indian government has also invested 8000 crore Rupees (approx. US$1.02 Billion) over 5-years to boost quantum technologies under its National Quantum Mission.

In the private sector, large companies have made multiple investments in quantum technologies. Organizations such as Google, D-wave systems, and University of California Santa Barbara have formed partnerships and investments to develop quantum technology.

See also 
 Quantum nanoscience
 Atomic engineering
 QFET (quantum field-effect transistor)

References

Quantum information science
Emerging technologies
Technology by type